Bobby Pesavento (born July 12, 1979) is a former American football quarterback who played three seasons in the Arena Football League with the Colorado Crush and Austin Wranglers. He first enrolled at Miami University before transferring to Fort Scott Community College and then the University of Colorado Boulder. He attended Lake Central High School in St. John, Indiana. Pesavento was also a member of the Bakersfield Blitz of the af2.

References

External links
Just Sports Stats
College stats

Living people
1979 births
Players of American football from Indiana
American football quarterbacks
Miami RedHawks football players
Fort Scott Greyhounds football players
Colorado Buffaloes football players
Colorado Crush players
Austin Wranglers players
Bakersfield Blitz players
People from St. John, Indiana